"You and I" is a song written by Dennis Wilson, his former wife Karen Lamm-Wilson and close friend Gregg Jakobson. It was released as the eighth track on Dennis Wilson's 1977 debut solo album Pacific Ocean Blue. The song was released as a single in the United States, with the B-side being "Friday Night". The single failed to chart. The track, as with the rest of the album, was credited as being produced by Dennis Wilson and his close friend Gregg Jakobson.

According to Dennis the song "is about Karen and myself, that's it."

Sources

1977 singles
Dennis Wilson songs
Songs written by Dennis Wilson
Song recordings produced by Dennis Wilson
Songs written by Gregg Jakobson
1977 songs